Van Coevorden is one of the oldest aristocratic families from the Netherlands.

History
The family was already noble from earliest times ("Uradel"). The family's history began with Hendrik van Borculo, who in 1231 married Eufemia, a daughter of the lord of Coevorden, a municipality in the Drenthe province. Their grandson, Reinolt, started to call himself van Coeverden, after his grandmother. From this time onwards till the 17th century, the family played an important role in the region.

Reinolt's descendants still carry this name and belong to the Dutch nobility. In 1814 three member of the family were given the title Jonkheer. In 1991, 1992, 1993, and 2009 several members of the family were given the title of baron, near the end of 2018 another family member acquired the title of baron.

Coat of arms
The coat of arms of the family is in gold 3 red eagles (2:1). The family's motto is En Dieu mon espérence et mon epée à ma défence. (In God my hope and my sword to the defense).

Literature
 Detlev Schwennicke, Europäische Stammtafeln Band XXVII (2012) Tafel 82.

Surnames
Dutch noble families
Barons of the Netherlands